The 2013–14 season is Loyola's 5th season in the Philippines premier league, the UFL Division 1. They won the 2013 UFL Cup by defeating Pachanga Diliman, 3–2.

Current squad

Competitions

Pre-season and Friendlies

UFL Cup

Overview

Notes

References 

United Football League
F.C. Meralco Manila seasons